Gioacchino Busin (20 May 1930 – 28 April 2008) was an Italian cross-country skier. He competed in the men's 50 kilometre event at the 1956 Winter Olympics.

References

External links
 

1930 births
2008 deaths
Italian male cross-country skiers
Olympic cross-country skiers of Italy
Cross-country skiers at the 1956 Winter Olympics
Sportspeople from the Province of Belluno